The Freundeskreis der Wirtschaft, or Circle of Friends of the Economy (which became known as "Freundeskreis Reichsführer SS",  "Freundeskreis Himmler" or "Keppler Circle") was a group of German industrialists whose aim was to strengthen the ties between the Nazi Party and business and industry. The group was formed and co-ordinated by Wilhelm Keppler, one of Adolf Hitler's close economic advisors.

Role and development

Keppler, who had been a member of the NSDAP since 1927, formed the Circle after Hitler's request in 1932 for the formation of a "study group on economic questions". Members were not initially expected to be party members (though many later joined the party), and portrayed the group as "palaver" and an "innocuous gentleman's club". The size of the group never exceeded 40 members. Groups represented included manufacturing, banking, and SS officials.

The group became associated with Heinrich Himmler, a friend of Keppler, beginning in 1935. From 1936 to 1944, the members of the circle donated approximately 1 million Marks a year to Himmler for uses "outside the budget". One use of the money was to fund the Ahnenerbe, which conducted Aryan historical and eugenicist research. It also sponsored the Jewish skull collection, when 86 victims were selected at Auschwitz , then murdered using Zyklon B gas at Natzweiler concentration camp  and the corpses shipped to Reichsuniversität Straßburg for defleshing and ultimately public display by Professor August Hirt. The project stopped at this stage when Germany lost the war.

At least some members of the group, such as Friedrich Flick, later benefited from the NSDAP's policy of aryanization of Jewish-owned competitors.

Post-war sentencing of group members 

After the war, William Keppler was sentenced to ten years in prison following the Ministries Trial at Nuremberg in 1949. He was released in February 1951.

Friederich Flick was also sentenced to seven years after the Flick trial, and released early in 1950.
Oswald Pohl and Otto Ohlendorf were hanged for war crimes in the Nuremberg trials.

Members 
Members of the group included:

From manufacturing:
 Fritz Kranefuss, Keppler's nephew and member of the board at Brabag;
 Kurt Baron von Schröder and Emil Heinrich Meyer, ITT Corporation executives; 
 August Rosterg, the General Director of Wintershall;
 Otto Steinbrinck, the vice-president of Vereinigte Stahlwerke AG;
 Emil Helfferich, board chair of the German-American Petroleum Company;
 Friederich Flick, chair of Flick KG;
 Ewald Hecker, chair of Ilseder Hütte;
 Albert Vögler, of Vereinigte Stahlwerke;
 Heinrich Bütefisch, of IG-Farben;
 , of Norddeutsche Lloyd;
 Hans Walz, head of Robert Bosch GmbH (and later honored by Yad Vashem for his work to save Jews from the Holocaust)
From banking:
 Hjalmar Schacht, president of the Reichsbank;
 Karl Rasche, board member of the Dresdner Bank;
 Friedrich Reinhart, chairman of the board at Commerzbank
From politics and the SS:
 Carl Vincent Krogmann and Gottfried Graf von Bismarck-Schönhausen, political figures;
 Oswald Pohl, head of the Administrative and Economic office of the SS;
 Franz Hayler and Otto Ohlendorf, of the Reich Group for Commerce and Trade;
 group secretary Fritz Kranefuß, a former employee of Keppler's and member of Himmler's personal staff;
 group financial manager Kurt Baron von Schröder

See also 
 Secret Meeting of 20 February 1933
 Industrielleneingabe
 Private sector participation in Nazi crimes

References 

Nazi Party organizations
Heinrich Himmler